The 2012 Grand Prix Cycliste de Montréal was the third edition of the Grand Prix Cycliste de Montréal, a single-day professional bicycle road race. It was the 26th event of the 2012 UCI World Tour season. The race was one of the only two  events which are part of the World Tour calendar in North America, the other one being the Grand Prix Cycliste de Québec contested two days prior.

The race was won by Norwegian Lars Petter Nordhaug, who broke away from the lead group and attacked twice inside the final . He out sprinted Moreno Moser and Alexandr Kolobnev.

Course
The race consisted of 17 laps of a circuit  in length, and followed the same path as the 2011 edition. The circuit, around the main campus of the Université de Montréal, was well-suited for climbers and punchers with three climbs per lap. The finish was on an uphill climb with a small gradient of 4%, that was located on Avenue du Parc. There was a sharp, 180 degrees bend to the right situated 500 meters away from the line.  The total vertical climb of the race was 3,893 metres. The major difficulties were:

Kilometre 2: Côte Camilien-Houde: 1,8 kilometres, average gradient of 8%
Kilometre 6: Côte de la Polytechnque: 780 metres, average gradient of 6% with a pass of 200 metres at 11%
Kilometre 11: Avenue du Parc: 560 metres, average gradient of 4%

Teams
As the race was held under the auspices of the UCI World Tour, all eighteen UCI ProTeams were invited automatically. There were also 3 wildcard invitations, which were UCI Professional Continental teams: two French squads ( and ) and a Canadian one.

The 18 ProTeams that competed were:

The 3 UCI Professional Continental teams that competed were:

Race summary

The first significant breakaway occurred at kilometre 31, when Manuele Boaro got away, soon to be joined by Cyril Gautier and Egoi Martínez. It was the second time that Boaro tried his luck, the first attempt was annulled a little earlier. Martinez and Gauthier were finally caught on the Côte de la Polytechnique during the penultimate lap. Other attacks occurred, but the bunch was back together as they crossed the line to race the last lap.

On the Côte Camilien-Houde, 's David Veilleux attacked, while Janez Brajkovič and Gerald Ciolek collided and crashed during the climb. Lars Petter Nordhaug then placed an attack of his own, being screamed on by his team via his earpiece to go for the victory since his teammate Edvald Boasson Hagen was out of energy.

Nordhaug was caught by Moreno Moser and Alexandr Kolobnev on the Avenue du Parc, near the flamme rouge. Simon Gerrans, who won the Grand Prix Cycliste de Québec 2 days before, sprinted to fourth place.

Results

References

External links
 
 Photographs of the event

2012
2012 UCI World Tour
Grand Prix Cycliste de Montreal
Grand Prix Cycliste de Montreal
September 2012 sports events in Canada